Cacia inculta is a species of beetle in the family Cerambycidae. It was described by Francis Polkinghorne Pascoe in 1857.

Subspecies
 Cacia inculta inculta Pascoe, 1857
 Cacia inculta inspinosa Breuning, 1939

References

Cacia (beetle)
Beetles described in 1857